The National Intelligence Grid or NATGRID is the integrated intelligence master database structure for counter-terrorism purpose connecting databases of various core security agencies under Government of India collecting comprehensive patterns procured from 21 different organizations that can be readily accessed by security agencies round the clock. Its current CEO is Ashish Gupta, IPS. It is reported to be operational since 31 December 2020.

NATGRID came into existence after the 2008 Mumbai attacks. The government of India in July 2016 appointed Ashok Patnaik as the Chief Executive Officer (CEO) of the National Intelligence Grid (NATGRID). The appointment is being seen as the government's effort to revive the project. Patnaik's appointment was valid till 31 December 2018. As of 2019, NATGRID is headed by an Indian Police Service (IPS) officer Ashish Gupta. Ministry of Home Affairs (MHA) on 5 February 2020 announced in Parliament that Project NATGRID with all its required physical infrastructures been completed as of 31 March 2020 and the NATGRID solution went live as of 31 December 2020. During the inauguration of NATGRID campus in Bengaluru, MHA Amit Shah stated that a new national database is in the process of being made which will bring a paradigm shift in the current ways of functioning of agencies once it's ready also adding that the government has entrusted the task of developing and operating a state-of-the-art and innovative technology system. It is accessible to 11 central agencies in the first phase and in later phases will be made accessible to police of all States and Union Territories and only authorized personnel are allowed access to the platform on a case-to-case basis for investigations into suspected cases of terrorism. NATGRID has a total fund allocation of 3,400 crore rupees.

Reason for establishment 
The 26/11 attacks on Mumbai led to the exposure of several weaknesses in India's intelligence gathering and action networks. NATGRID is part of the radical overhaul of the security and intelligence apparatuses of India that was mooted by the then Home Minister P. Chidambaram in 2009. The National Investigation Agency (NIA) and the National Counter Terrorism Centre (NCTC) are two organisations established in the aftermath of the Mumbai attacks of 2008. Before the Mumbai attacks, a Pakistani origin American Lashkar-e-Taiba (LeT) operative David Coleman Headley had visited India several times and done a recce of the places that came under attack on 26/11. Despite having travelled to India several times and having returned to the US through Pakistan or West Asia, his trips failed to raise the suspicion of Indian agencies as they lacked a system that could reveal a pattern in his unusual travel itineraries and trips to the country. It is argued that if they had a system like the NATGRID in place, Headley would have been apprehended well before the attacks.

Structure and functions 
NATGRID is an intelligence sharing network that collates data from the standalone databases of the various agencies and ministries of the Indian government. It is a counter terrorism measure that collects and collates a host of information from government databases including tax and bank account details, credit/debit card transactions, visa and immigration records and itineraries of rail and air travel. It also has access to the Crime and Criminal Tracking Network and Systems, a database that links crime information, including First Information Reports, across 14,000 police stations in India. This combined data will be made available to 11 central agencies, which are: Research and Analysis Wing (R&AW), Intelligence Bureau (IB), National Investigation Agency (NIA), Central Bureau of Investigation (CBI), Narcotics Control Bureau (NCB), Financial Intelligence Unit (FIU), Enforcement Directorate (ED),   Central Board of Direct Taxes (CBDT),   Central Board of Indirect Taxes and Customs (CBIC), Directorate of Revenue Intelligence (DRI) and Directorate General of GST Intelligence. Also as stated by the MHA Amit Shah, NATGRID will have an in-built mechanism for continuous upgradation. In the later phases of NATGRID integration, the central government further plans to integrate 950 additional organizations into it.

NATGRID is being implemented in four different phases. United Progressive Alliance (UPA) government gave clearance of ₹3,400 crores for the project. The Cabinet Committee on Security approved the initial two phases in 2011 which were operational by 2014 at a cost of 1,200 crores, with 10 user agencies and 21 service providers were connected while the first data sets retrievable from early 2013. Capt. P. Raghu Raman (Rtd.) on 1 December 2009 was appointed as the Secretary and CEO for NATGRID and tasked with the establishment of the grid. His term ended on 31 May 2014. The implementation of the third and fourth phases are expected to require amendments to several laws to allow for the sharing and transfer of data on items such as property and bank transaction details and Internet usage. The data recovery centre for NATGRID is at Bengaluru.

Unlike the NIA which are central agencies, the NATGRID is essentially a tool that enables security agencies to locate and obtain relevant information on terror suspects from pooled data sets of various organizations and services in the country. It will help identify, capture and prosecute terrorists and help pre-empt terror plots.

Opposition 
NATGRID faced opposition on charges of possible violations of privacy and leakage of confidential personal information. Its efficacy in preventing terror have also been questioned given that no state agency or police force has access to its database thus reducing chances of immediate, effective action. NATGRID claims to be protected by several structural and procedural safeguards and oversight mechanisms including that of external audits and technology safeguards.

See also
National Technical Research Organisation
NETRA, a mass surveillance
Central Monitoring System
Telecom Enforcement Resource and Monitoring
Multi Agency Centre (India)

References 

Ministry of Home Affairs (India)
Computer networks
E-government in India
Mass surveillance
Cyber Security in India